Vriesea boeghii is a species of plant in the family Bromeliaceae, endemic to Loja Province in Ecuador.  Its natural habitats are subtropical or tropical moist montane forests and subtropical or tropical high-altitude shrubland. It is threatened by habitat loss.

Sources

Endemic flora of Ecuador
Epiphytes
Plants described in 1992
boeghii
Near threatened plants
Taxonomy articles created by Polbot